The Piau River is a river of Bahia state in eastern Brazil. It is a tributary of the Una River.

See also
List of rivers of Bahia

References

Rivers of Bahia